Kard (stylized in all caps or K.A.R.D) is a South Korean co-ed group formed by DSP Media. They are composed of members J.Seph, BM, Somin, and Jiwoo. They officially debuted on July 19, 2017, with their extended play Hola Hola.

History

Pre-debut 
Somin was previously a member of DSP Media's Japan-based girl group Puretty, which disbanded two years after its debut in 2012. She later joined Kara Project, where she competed to become a new member of KARA and finished in second place. On August 24, 2015, she debuted as leader of DSP Media's girl group April, but she decided to depart from the group on November 9.

Male members J.Seph trained for five years, while BM trained for four and a half years under DSP Media. The label originally planned to debut them in a hip-hop duo, but this was changed later on. Prior to his debut, BM was featured in Goo Ha-ra's song "La La La" from her 2015 debut EP Alohara (Can You Feel It?), and was also her dance partner for the music video and live performances of its lead single "Choco Chip Cookies".

The last member of the group was Jiwoo, who had trained under FNC Entertainment for two years and moved to DSP Media in 2016, where she only trained for two months before debuting with Kard.

2016–2017: Project singles 

DSP Media first announced the formation of Kard on December 1, 2016 after opening several social media accounts under the group's name. After being revealed in a sequential order, all the members of the group were revealed by December 5, with the label elaborating more on their card-game concept. The group's name is an abbreviation of different "cards" that are assigned to each member: BM is assigned as the "King" card, J.Seph is known as the "Ace" card, Somin is given the "Black JokeR" card, while member Jiwoo is referred to as the "Color JokeR" card. A certain "hiDDen card" was also stated by the agency, but was not further elaborated in its statement. DSP Media then confirmed that the group's first release was slated on December 13.

On December 8, Kard revealed that their first "hiDDen card" member would be their labelmate Heo Young-ji, and further elaborated that Youngji would be active only in the first release of the group's "Kard Project", wherein they will release three project singles each with their own "hidden card" feature before their official debut. The announcement was made by the group's four members including Youngji in a live broadcast on the V-Live app. The following day, the music video teaser for their first project single titled "Oh NaNa" was released.

"Oh NaNa" was released on December 13. The music video for the song accumulated over 1.25 million views in three days. Following the release of the song, Billboard magazine included Kard in its list of "10 Best New K-pop Groups in 2016" ranking at number 8, with the group making it into the list just eight days after starting their pre-debut project. "Oh NaNa" then became the group's first entry into the Billboard World Digital Song Sales chart, with the song peaking at number 5 in its issue dated January 7, 2017 and remaining on the said chart for 8 weeks.

On January 19, 2017, Billboard selected Kard as one of the "Top 5 K-Pop Artists to Watch in 2017", citing the group's mixed-gender setup and their international attention which was seen when the music video for "Oh NaNa" became one of the top-viewed video in the United States for the month of December.

On February 16, Kard released their second project single titled "Don't Recall", at number 22 on the UK Singles Chart, and at number 34th on the Brazilian Song Chart. Six days after the song's release, the music video for "Don't Recall" had accumulated over 6 million views. Similar to its predecessor, "Don't Recall" charted on Billboards World Digital Song Sales chart and peaked at number 5 in its issue dated March 18, 2017, but remained on the chart longer, charting for 12 weeks. An English version of the song was released by the group on March 1, which marked the group's second "hidden card" release.

On April 21, LG Electronics announced that it has selected the group as their global ambassador for the G6 Smartphone. Following this development, it was revealed that all content for Kard's final project single titled "Rumor", including its music videos, will be produced in collaboration with LG Electronics G6. "Rumor" was then released on April 24, with the song's music video featuring Korean choreographer Z.Sun as the group's third "hidden card" member.

The group then embarked on their first concert tour, known as the 2017 Wild Kard Tour, held in 11 cities covering Canada, the United States, Mexico, and Brazil from May to June 2017. It was reported that all tickets for the concert tour were sold out. In the midst of the group's tour, Kard was featured in their first solo reality series titled "Secret Kard", which depicted the group's experiences during their "Wild Kard" concert tour. The series first premiered at Mnet's M2 YouTube channel on June 19.

 2017–2018: Debut and touring 

Kard marked their official debut on July 19, 2017, through the release of their first EP Hola Hola. The six-track EP contained their previous project singles, as well as the title track "Hola Hola". The group held their debut showcase at the Ilji Art Hall in Gangnam-gu, Seoul. The album debuted on several Billboard charts, charting at number 3 on World Albums, at number 25 on Heatseekers Albums, and at number 46 on the Independent Album Chart. The album's eponymous title track also entered the Billboard World Digital Song Sales chart at number 4, while other tracks of the album, “I Can’t Stop“ and “Living Good” ranked number 10 and number 12, respectively.

On August 19, Kard performed at the 2017 Summer Sonic Festival, known as one of the world's largest rock festivals, held in Japan. On the next day, the group performed at the second day of the 2017 KCON Festival held at the Staples Center in Los Angeles. Following their performance at KCON, the group then embarked on their second concert tour known as the "2017 Wild Kard Tour PT. 2" which was held from September to October 2017, with five European dates in London, Lisbon, Madrid, Milan, and Rotterdam, and five North American dates in Minneapolis; Washington, D.C.; New York City; Miami; and San Francisco.

The group released their second EP, You & Me, on November 21, with the song "You In Me" serving as the title track. You & Me debuted at number 8 on the Gaon Album Chart on the chart issue dated November 19–25, 2017, and also debuted at number 4 on the US World albums Chart and at number 17 on the US Heatseekers Albums chart, achieving their new peak as a group on the latter chart.

The female members of the group, Somin and Jiwoo, were featured in a special version of the song "Lo Siento", the lead single of Super Junior's album Replay (a repackaged album of their eighth Korean studio album Play). This version is included inside the digital version of the album, with the album being released on April 12, 2018. Somin and Jiwoo joined Super Junior to perform the song on various Korean music programs. Kard then held an Asia-wide tour spanning four countries: Singapore, Taiwan, Hong Kong and the Philippines. Kard also performed at the South By Southwest (SXSW) 2018.

On April 14, 2018, the group met local fans through their 2018 Wild Kard Tour in the Kasablanka Hall in Jakarta, Indonesia. Two meetings were then held in Australia in the city of Melbourne on April 26 and Sydney on the 29th. On July 25, 2018, they made their comeback with their third EP, Ride On the Wind. The EP debuted and peaked at number 7 on the Gaon Album Chart for the week ending July 28, 2018. The EP also debuted and peaked at number 8 on the Billboard World Albums chart.

On August 19, Kard held their first solo concert in South Korea since their debut, completing their "Wild Kard in Seoul" concert held at the YES24 Live Hall in Gwangjin-gu, Seoul.

 2019–2021: Red Moon and Way with Words 

On March 27, 2019, they made their comeback with their first digital single "Bomb Bomb". "Bomb Bomb" became the group's fifth top five entry on the Billboard World Digital Song Sales chart, debuting and peaking at number three.  A month later, Kard held their second concert in Seoul named as the "2019 Wild Kard in Seoul" at the Mary Hall of Sogang University in Mapo-gu, Seoul on April 27. The following month, Kard performed at the 2019 Dream Concert held at the World Cup Stadium in Sangam-dong, Seoul on May 18.

On July 12 and 14, Kard embarked on their Indian two-city tour known as the "Play Your Kard Right Tour", with the band performing at Delhi’s Talkatora Indoor Stadium and at the city of Guwahati.

On September 21, Kard made another comeback with their second digital single, "Dumb Litty". Following the success of the single which peaked at number three on the Billboard World Digital Song Sales chart, Kard debuted on the Billboard Social 50 chart, ranking at number 41 on its tally dated on October 5 as they experienced a 39% increase in Twitter mentions and a 457% increase in YouTube subscribers.

Throughout the month of October, Kard embarked on their "Wild Kard Tour in USA 2019" with five concert dates held in different cities in the United States. The tour wrapped up on October 27 at the Buckhead Theatre in Atlanta. The following month, on November 6, Kard appeared at the Young Hollywood studio in Los Angeles, talking about their comeback song "Dumb Litty", and playing the Mystery Box Challenge game.

On February 12, 2020, Kard released their fourth EP, Red Moon. The EP debuted and peaked at number 10 on the Gaon Album Chart for the week ending February 15, after reporting 1,453 copies sold, before reporting a total of 1,752 copies sold in its first two weeks. Additionally, its eponymous title track reached a peak position of number 8 on the Billboard World Digital Song Sales Chart.

On August 26, 2020, Kard released their first single album Way with Words and their title track "Gunshot". BM wrote, composed, and arranged the title track, with the other members contributing to the album as well. "Gunshot" reached a peak position of number 9 on the Billboard World Digital Song Sales Chart on September 12, and spent a total of three weeks on the chart. 

On October 5, J.Seph quietly enlisted for his mandatory military service as an active duty soldier. Kard then continued promoting as a three-piece group, making their first live performance without J.Seph on the second season of KCON's online series KCON:TACT held on October 16–25. BM debuted as the group's first soloist in 2021, releasing his single album The First Statement on July 2.

 2022–present: Return with Re: 

On January 21, BM released his first solo comeback with the single "Lost in Euphoria."

On April 4, it was confirmed that J. Seph had been discharged from his military service. However, due to the spread of COVID-19, J. Seph's last vacation was in mid-February, where he did not return to military service and was discharged early. On May 28, DSP Media announced that Kard will release a new album in June and resume all activities, marking their first full group release in 22 months.  Their fifth EP, Re:, was released on June 22 with the title track "Ring The Alarm".

On July 7, DSP Media announced that Kard has renewed their contracts with them for three more years.

 Artistry 
Kard's brand of K-pop has been described as "undeniably trendy", with their discography focusing on contemporary house and dancehall vibes, which Billboard has referred to as something that is "pulled directly from Top 40 charts". The group's musical style diverges from electropop, hip hop, EDM, and alt-R&B that was known to have been trending in the American music market by the time of their pre-debut. The group was also noted for their reggaetón and moombahton styling that resonated with international K-pop fans, which was stated by Billboard to be one of the primary reasons why they were able to tour throughout North and South America even prior to releasing their first mini-album. While they are largely inspired by Latin dance music trends, Kard has stated that they are continuously studying other genres in order to keep showing new sides to their music style. A notable shift in Kard's sonic style was first seen through the release of their single "Dumb Litty", which incorporated dancehall alongside synth, trap, and EDM. Following the release of their fourth EP, Red Moon, member BM has dubbed moombahton as "a symbol of Kard".

The group's nature in their sonic base is apparent in the members' personal musical influences: BM cites American rapper Tupac and J.Cole as his inspiration, J.Seph cites Korean rapper Beenzino, Somin takes inspiration from Tinashe and Ariana Grande, while member Jiwoo cites Beyonce and Rihanna.

 Public image and reception 
Mixed-gender groups are considered a rarity in the Korean music industry, with several co-ed acts like Play The Siren, Sunny Hill, and Co-Ed being regarded as unsuccessful. With Kard's debut, Forbes noted that the group was "headed for worldwide success" after quickly building an international presence through their North and South American tour in their pre-debut, which was further expanded following the release of Hola Hola. Billboard magazine has described Kard to be "one of the most successful co-ed K-pop acts to ever exist" which was seen when their debut EP landed at number 3 on the World Albums Chart.

While Kard has risen to international success especially in South America, they have been criticized for focusing primarily on the international music market. Due to their lack of promotions in their country of origin, a Korean broadcasting station official once told the members of Kard that they were "like a fictional group [to him]". However, the group has stated that they are aiming for further activities in South Korea.

Members
 J.Seph
 BM
 Somin
 Jiwoo

 Discography 

Extended plays

Single albums

Singles

Other charted songs

Soundtrack appearances

Album participations

ConcertsHeadlining tours'
 Wild Kard Tour (2017–2019)
 Play Your Kard Right Tour (2019–present)
 Wild Kard In Brazil, Mexico, Chile & USA (2022)

Videography

Music videos

Awards and nominations

Notes

References

2016 establishments in South Korea
DSP Media artists
K-pop music groups
Musical groups established in 2016
Musical groups from Seoul
Musical quartets
South Korean co-ed groups
South Korean electronic music groups
Tropical house musicians